Niall Ó Donnghaile (born 28 May 1985) is an Irish Sinn Féin politician who has served as Leader of Sinn Féin in the Seanad since June 2020 and a Senator for the Administrative Panel since April 2016. He previously served as Lord Mayor of Belfast from 2011 to 2012 and a Councillor on Belfast City Council from 2011 to 2016.

Early life and career 
He was born in Belfast, Northern Ireland. Ó Donnghaile was a Sinn Féin councillor for the Pottinger district electoral area in East Belfast. He was educated through Irish at Coláiste Feirste, Belfast and subsequently obtained a B.A. in Politics from Ulster University.

Ó Donnghaile was previously employed as the party's Press Officer in the Northern Ireland Assembly.

A community worker in the Short Strand, the area of East Belfast in which he was born, and a member of the Short Strand Partnership Board, he also works with various other organisations in Belfast on issues such as the developments at Titanic Quarter and Sirocco Quays, and has spoken strongly in support of residents on the issue of the proposed runway extension at Belfast City Airport.

Lord Mayor of Belfast
Ó Donnghaile became Lord Mayor of Belfast in June 2011. Aged 25 at the time, he was the city's youngest ever Lord Mayor.

Controversies
Ó Donnghaile said he wanted to represent all the people of Belfast. Ruth Patterson of the Democratic Unionist Party (DUP) became Deputy Lord Mayor. She refused to talk to him or shake his hand. Her party backed her in this decision.

After taking office, he removed portraits of Queen Elizabeth The Queen Mother and Prince Charles from the Mayor's parlour, replacing them with a portrait of the United Irishmen and a copy of the Proclamation of the Irish Republic. He kept portraits of Elizabeth II and Prince Philip on display. He said he did this to make the parlour "more reflective of Belfast". Unionist councillors demanded that the two royal portraits be put back.

In December 2011, he declined to present an award to a Belfast girl who was a British Army cadet. He explained: "At the last minute I was informed that one of the awards was to be presented to a representative of the Army Cadet Force [...] to avoid any unnecessary sensitivities to either party, it was arranged for the outgoing chairman of the organisation to present some of the certificates alongside me".

References

External links
Niall Ó Donnghaile's page on the Sinn Féin website

1985 births
Living people
Lord Mayors of Belfast
Members of the 25th Seanad
Sinn Féin senators
Politicians from Belfast
Sinn Féin councillors in Northern Ireland
Members of the 26th Seanad
Sinn Féin parliamentary candidates